Virginia María García (1978) is an Argentine politician who was a national senator of the Front for Victory for Santa Cruz Province.

References 

Living people
Members of the Argentine Senate for Santa Cruz
Women members of the Argentine Senate
Members of the Argentine Council of Magistracy
21st-century Argentine politicians
21st-century Argentine women politicians
Year of birth missing (living people)